Callison was an international architecture firm based in Seattle, Washington. Callison was founded by Tony Callison in 1975 and grew to 900 employees around the world prior to its acquisition by Arcadis NV in 2014. In October 2015, Callison was formally merged with another Arcadis subsidiary, RTKL Associates, to form CallisonRTKL headquartered in Baltimore, Maryland.

Callison planned and designed retail, hospitality, mixed-use, workplace, corporate and healthcare projects worldwide.

Corporate
From its founding in Seattle in 1975, the company grew to over 900 employees worldwide, with offices across the globe: Seattle, Los Angeles, Mexico City, Dallas, Scottsdale, New York City, London, Dubai, Beijing, Shanghai and Guangzhou.

In August 2014, Callison announced it would be acquired by Arcadis NV, a global design, engineering and management consulting firm based in Amsterdam.

Shortly after the acquisition Arcadis began marketing Callison together with another recent acquisition, Baltimore-based RTKL, with a combined "CallisonRTKL" website and press releases. In October 2015, the two firms were formally merged to form CallisonRTKL headquartered in Baltimore, Maryland. At the time of the merger, the two firms together had together booked $402.4 million in architecture and engineering revenue in the prior year, and Architectural Record ranked the combined firms fifth in the nation.

Callison has been recognized with awards for design, architecture, and green design.

Notable projects 

 Tata New Haven  - Bangalore, India 
Inorbit Hyderabad - Hyderabad, India
 Hongyi Plaza - Shanghai, China
 FlatIron Crossing Mall - Broomfield, Colorado
 The Pearl-Qatar – Porto Arabia - Doha, Qatar
 W Hotel - Seattle, Washington
 Unitech Grande - Noida, India
 Coastal City - Shenzhen, China
 Harvey Nichols - Dubai and Jakarta
 Boeing World Headquarters - Chicago, Illinois
 2201 Westlake - Seattle, Washington
 Grand Gateway - Shanghai, China
 Sogo - Osaka, Japan
 Swedish Medical Center, Eastside Specialty Center - Issaquah, Washington
 Hotel Terra - Jackson Hole, Wyoming
 The Bravern - Bellevue, Washington
 Harrods White Cosmetics Hall - London, England
 St. Charles Medical Center Redmond - Redmond, Oregon
 Microsoft Campus - Redmond, Washington
 Greenbelt 3 - Manila, Philippines
 Lotte Center Hanoi - Hanoi, Vietnam
 Nordstrom - Since 1975 Callison has provided the retailer (both companies are based in Seattle) the design for more than 155 new and remodeled stores; and continues to complete 10 projects, on average, every year for the company.

References

External links
 

Architecture firms based in Washington (state)
Companies based in Seattle
Design companies established in 1975
Design companies disestablished in 2015
1975 establishments in Washington (state)
2015 disestablishments in Washington (state)